Northern Railway of Ireland was an Irish gauge  railway company in Ireland.

It was formed by a merger of the Dublin and Drogheda Railway (D&D) with the Dublin and the Belfast Junction Railway (D&BJct) in 1875. In 1876 it merged with the Irish North Western Railway (INW) and Ulster Railway to form the Great Northern Railway (Ireland).

Railway companies established in 1875
Railway companies disestablished in 1876
Irish gauge railways
Great Northern Railway (Ireland)
Defunct railway companies of Ireland